Kazemabad (also Romanized as Kāz̧emābād and Kāzimābād; also known as Qāsemābād) is a city in Chatrud District, Kerman County, Kerman Province, Iran.  At the 2006 census, its population was 3,612, in 812 families.

References

Populated places in Kerman County

Cities in Kerman Province